The Bear and the Doll is a 1970 French romantic comedy film directed by Michel Deville, starring Brigitte Bardot and Jean-Pierre Cassel.

Premise
Felicia, a high-spirited woman, crashes her car into that of a Gaspard, a conservative musician and single father. Felicia is frustrated that Gaspard does not find her attractive and sets out to seduce him.

Cast
 Brigitte Bardot as Felicia
 Jean-Pierre Cassel as Gaspard
 Daniel Ceccaldi as Ivan
  as Stephane
 Patrick Gilles as Titus
 Julien Verdier as Tabard
 Claude Beauthéac as Millot
  as Bernard
 Olivier Stroh as Arthur
 Patricia Darmon as Mariette
 Sabine Haudepin as Julie
  as Charlotte
 Claude Jetter as hippie girl

Production
The film was inspired by American screwball comedies of the 1930s and was written with Catherine Deneuve in mind. Alain Delon and Jean Paul Belmondo were offered the male lead but turned it down. Filming took place in the summer of 1969.

Reception
Vincent Canby of The New York Times wrote that "the maneuverings are mostly the tactics of coy moviemaking here involving several awful child actors, windshield wipers that comment on the action, a huge but gentle dog, a Siamese cat named Prudhomme, and endless little rages between the lovers that define their real affection... Charm is the ingredient that is in singularly short supply in The Bear and the Doll, largely, I suspect, because Miss Bardot, once a sex kitten, now approaches middle age with all of the grace of a seasoned predator."

References

External links
 
 
 The Bear and the Doll at Premiere France

1970 films
1970s French-language films
1970 romantic comedy films
Films directed by Michel Deville
French romantic comedy films
1970s French films